Floor area ratio (FAR) is the ratio of a building's total floor area (gross floor area) to the size of the piece of land upon which it is built. It is often used as one of the regulations in city planning along with the building-to-land ratio. The terms can also refer to limits imposed on such a ratio through zoning. FAR includes all floor areas but is indifferent to their spatial distribution on the lot whereas the building coverage ratio (or lot coverage) measures building footprint on the lot but is indifferent to building height.

Written as a formula, FAR = .

Lower maximum-allowed floor area ratios are linked to lower land values and lower housing density.

Terminology 
Floor Area ratio is sometimes called floor space ratio (FSR), floor space index (FSI), site ratio or plot ratio.

The difference between FAR and FSI is that the first is a ratio, while the latter is an index.
Index numbers are values expressed as a percentage of a single base figure. Thus an FAR of 1.5 is translated as an FSI of 150%.

Regional variation 
The terms most commonly used for this measurement vary from one country or region to the next.

In Australia floor space ratio (FSR) is used in New South Wales and plot ratio in Western Australia.

In France coefficient d'occupation des sols (COS) is used.

In India floor space index (FSI) and floor area ratio (FAR) are both used.

In the United Kingdom and Hong Kong both plot ratio and site ratio are used.

In Singapore the terms plot ratio and gross plot ratio (GPR) are more commonly used.

In the United States and Canada, floor space ratio (FSR) and floor area ratio (FAR) are both used.

Use ratios are used as a measure of the density of the site being developed. High FAR indicates a dense construction. The ratio is generated by dividing the building area by the parcel area, using the same units.

History 
One of the purposes of the 1916 zoning ordinance of New York City was to prevent tall buildings from obstructing too much light and air. The 1916 zoning ordinance sought to control building size by regulating height and setback requirements for towers. In 1961, a revision to the zoning ordinance introduced the concept of floor area ratio (FAR). Buildings built before 1961 often have FARs that would be unachievable today, such as the Empire State Building which has an FAR of 25 - meaning that it earns considerably greater rent than a newer building on the same land could hope for.

Purpose and use 
The floor area ratio (FAR) can be used in zoning to limit urban density. While it directly limits building density, indirectly it also limits the number of people that a building can hold, without controlling a building's external shape.

For example, if lot must adhere to a 0.1 FAR, then the total area of all floors in all buildings on the lot must be no more than one-tenth the area of the parcel itself. In other words, if the lot was 10,000 sq. ft, then the total floor area of all floors in all buildings must not exceed 1,000 sq. ft.

An architect can plan for either a single-story building consuming the entire allowable area in one floor, or a multi-story building that rises higher above the plane of the land, but which must consequently result in a smaller footprint than would a single-story building of the same total floor area.  By combining the horizontal and vertical limits into a single figure, some flexibility is permitted in building design, while achieving a hard limit on at least one measure of overall size.  One advantage to fixing this parameter, as opposed to others such as height, width, or length, is that floor area correlates well with other considerations relevant to zoning regulation, such as total parking that would be required for an office building, total number of units that might be available for residential use, total load on municipal services, etc.  The amounts of these things tend to be constant for a given total floor area, regardless of how that area is distributed horizontally and vertically.  Thus, many jurisdictions have found it unnecessary to include hard height limitations when using floor area ratio calculations.

Common exclusions to the total calculation of square footage for the purpose of floor area ratio (FAR) include unoccupied areas such as mechanical equipment floors, basements exclusively used for parking, stair towers, elevator shafts, and parking garages.

Japan 
Japan has extensively adopted the floor area ratio in the zoning system since 1970.

India 
In India FAR and FSI are both used. FAR regulations vary from city to city and generally it is from 1.3 to 3.25. In Mumbai 1.33 is the norm but higher FSI is allowed along the Metro rail line and slum areas like Dharavi. In Bangalore, 40 feet streets allow only an FAR of 1.75 but 100 feet streets allow 3.25 FAR.

Impact on land value 
FAR has a major impact on the value of the land. Higher allowable FAR yields higher land value.

A 2022 study found that lower maximum-allowed FAR in New York City led to lower land value and lower density.

Criticism 

Andres Duany et al. (2000) note:
 Abdicating to floor area ratios (market forces) is the opposite of aiming a community toward something more than the sum of its parts.  
 FAR, a poor predictor of physical form, should not be used when the objective is to conserve and enhance neighborhood character; whereas traditional design standards (height, lot coverage and setbacks or build-to lines) enable anyone to make reasonably accurate predictions, recognize violations, and feel secure in their investment decisions. 
 If FAR is carelessly combined with traditional setbacks, assembled lots have a considerable advantage over individual lots, which has a negative effect on fine-grained cities and the diversity of ownership.

Clarifying Duany's second criticism in reference to "lot coverage": If localities seek to regulate density through floor area ratio, the logical consequence is to encourage expansive one story building with less green space, as single story construction is less expensive than multi-story construction on a per square foot basis. On the other hand, if density is regulated by building coverage ratio (a.k.a. lot coverage or site coverage) then green space can be preserved and multi-story construction becomes financial advantageous. This outcome is demonstrated in the illustration comparing FAR to BCR.

Footnotes

References 
 Meriam, Dwight (2004). The Complete Guide to Zoning. McGraw-Hill. 
 Birch, Eugenie L. (2009). "The Urban and Regional Planning Reader". Routledge.

External links 
 An explanation of the floor area ratio by J.H. Crawford
 Complete information on FSI or floor area ratio by Civil Site

Urban studies and planning terminology
Real property law
Engineering ratios

de:Maß der baulichen Nutzung#Geschossflächenzahl (GFZ)